Ernesto Lagos Salinas (born 30 January 1930) is a Chilean high jumper. He competed in the men's high jump at the 1951 Pan American Games (fifth place), the 1952 Summer Olympics, and the 1955 Pan American Games (fourth place). At the South American Championships he won silver medals in 1952, 1954 and 1956, and a bronze medal in 1958.

References

1930 births
Possibly living people
Athletes (track and field) at the 1951 Pan American Games
Athletes (track and field) at the 1952 Summer Olympics
Athletes (track and field) at the 1955 Pan American Games
Chilean male high jumpers
Olympic athletes of Chile
Place of birth missing (living people)
Pan American Games competitors for Chile